Sounds of a Playground Fading is the tenth studio album by Swedish heavy metal band In Flames, released on 15 June 2011. It is the first album recorded by In Flames without founding guitarist Jesper Strömblad, who left the band in February 2010, making it also the only In Flames release not to have two guitarists. The album was reissued in 2014, featuring five additional tracks.

Background
According to Anders, this album features increasingly wide vocal registers and reduced growls. In addition, some of the album's songs "pretty much go against the hard rock formula."

The entire album was written by Björn Gelotte. The guitar solos, unlike most other albums, were able to be pre-planned out and worked much better according to the in-studio report.

Release and promotion
The band revealed the cover art, track listing and first single, "Deliver Us", on their official Facebook page in April and May 2011. Then on 3 June 2011, aol.com streamed the entire album on their music network. In Flames performed the album on their European tour with support from Noctiferia, as part of the "Defenders of the Faith III" tour, with bands Trivium, Rise to Remain, Ghost and Insense, and with Trivium in their North American Tour.

Four music videos were filmed including the lead single "Deliver Us" and "Where the Dead Ships Dwell" both released in 2011 while "Ropes" and "Sounds of a Playground Fading" were also filmed but not released until 2013.

The track "Deliver Us" was featured in the soundtrack to the 2013 video game Saints Row IV.

Reception
Sounds of a Playground Fading received generally positive reviews. Review aggregate Metacritic gave the album a 68 out of 100 based on 6 professional critics.

Commercial performance
It debuted at number 27 on the US Billboard 200 album chart; number 2 on the Top Hard Rock chart, number 7 on the Top Rock chart and number 5 on the Top Independent chart. It also debuted at Number 1 of the Media Control German Albums chart, and at Number 12 of the Billboard Canadian Albums chart.

Track listing
All music written by Björn Gelotte and all lyrics by Anders Fridén. All songs arranged by In Flames.

Personnel
In Flames
Anders Fridén – vocals
Björn Gelotte – guitars
Peter Iwers – bass
Daniel Svensson – drums, percussion

Production
Anders Björler – filming, editing and directing ("In the Studio"/studio report)
Johannes Bergion – cello (on "A New Dawn")
Roberto Laghi – producer
Örjan Örnkloo – keyboards and samples
Dave Correia – album cover art

Charts

Release Dates

References

2011 albums
Century Media Records albums
In Flames albums